Noam Shoham is a former Israeli international footballer and the manager of Hapoel Kfar Shalem.

Honours
Israeli Premier League (2):
1991–92, 1994–95, 1995–96
Israel State Cup (2):
1994, 1996
Toto Cup (1):
1992–93

References

Living people
1970 births
Israeli Jews
Israeli footballers
Maccabi Tel Aviv F.C. players
Maccabi Ramat Amidar F.C. players
Hapoel Ashkelon F.C. players
Hapoel Rishon LeZion F.C. players
Maccabi Netanya F.C. players
Hapoel Be'er Sheva F.C. players
Hapoel Kfar Saba F.C. players
Hapoel Tzafririm Holon F.C. players
Maccabi Kafr Kanna F.C. players
Hapoel Marmorek F.C. players
A.S. Eilat players
Hapoel Maxim Lod F.C. players
Hapoel Herzliya F.C. players
Maccabi Be'er Ya'akov F.C. players
Ironi Ramla F.C. players
Hapoel F.C. Ortodoxim Lod players
Liga Leumit players
Israeli Premier League players
Hapoel Hod HaSharon F.C. managers
Hapoel Herzliya F.C. managers
Hapoel Nir Ramat HaSharon F.C. managers
Association football midfielders
Israeli football managers
Israel international footballers